Felipe Dana (born August 15, 1985) is a Brazilian photojournalist for the Associated Press (AP), known for his work covering social inequality and urban violence in Latin America and conflicts in the Middle East. Dana received World Press Photo awards in 2013 and 2017 and participated in the first World Press Photo Masterclass Latin America in 2015. He was part of Associated Press teams finalist for the Pulitzer Prize in 2017, 2018, 2019 and 2021. In 2019, he was named Agency Photographer of the Year by The Guardian and Ibero American Photographer of the Year by POYi Latam. He has also earned numerous awards from Pictures of the Year International (POYi), National Press Photographers Association (NPPA),  Overseas Press Club of America (OPC) and others. His drone footage of the Battle of Mosul in Iraq open the action film Mosul on Netflix.

Awards 

 2011: Atlanta Photojournalism Awards
 2012: Atlanta Photojournalism Awards
 2013: POY - Pictures of the Year Latam, 3 awards
 2013: World Press Photo award
 2015: NPPA National Press Photographers Association
 2016: NPPA National Press Photographers Association,2 awards
 2016: POYi Pictures of the Year International
 2016: SPJ Sigma Delta Chi Award
 2016: APME Associated Press Media Editors
 2016: Oliver S. Gramling Journalism Awards - AP
 2016: Atlanta Photojournalism Awards
 2017: APME Associated Press Media Editors
 2017: Finalist, Pulitzer Prize for Breaking News Photography
 2017: World Press Photo award
 2017: NPPA National Press Photographers Association, 3 awards
 2017: Atlanta Photojournalism Awards
 2018: Finalist, Pulitzer Prize for International Reporting
 2018: OPC - Overseas Press Club of America
 2018: Shorty Awards, Nominated
 2018: National Headliner Awards, 2 awards
 2018: APME Associated Press Media Editors
 2018: POYi Pictures of the Year International
 2019: Finalist, Pulitzer Prize for Breaking News Photography
 2019: POYi Pictures of the Year International
 2019: The Guardian: Agency Photographer of the Year
 2019: POY - Pictures of the Year Latam, 3 awards
 2020: Atlanta Photojournalism Awards, 2 awards
 2020: NPPA National Press Photographers Association
 2021: POY - Pictures of the Year Latam
2021: Finalist, Pulitzer Prize for Breaking News Photography

References

External links 
 Felipe Dana's website
 Associated Press: Mosul endgame in Images
 National Geographic - Among the ruins of Mosul 
 National Geographic - Why Zika Is This Year’s Scary Virus
 TIME - An Unexpected Encounter in Mosul's Ruins 
 New York Times - Civilians Escape ISIS

1985 births
Living people
Brazilian photographers
Photojournalists
Associated Press reporters
Associated Press photographers